In the video game industry, 2020 saw the launch of the next generation of video game consoles, with both Microsoft and Sony Interactive Entertainment having released the Xbox Series X/S and PlayStation 5 consoles, respectively, in November 2020. The industry was heavily affected by the impact of the COVID-19 pandemic which had begun in March and was characterized by COVID-19 lockdowns and remote work. While this caused numerous delays in software and hardware releases and the cancellation of live conferences and events in favor of virtual shows, it also created a boon for the industry as people turned to gaming as a means to pass the time. The industry also reacted to various political/cultural events.

Mobile gaming continued its growth as a major platform for video gaming; as part of this, Epic Games initiated the Epic Games v. Apple lawsuit over mobile app store revenue cut policies. Major planned acquisitions included Xbox Game Studios' acquisition of ZeniMax Media and its subsidiaries, and Electronic Arts outbidding Take-Two Interactive for Codemasters.

Top-rated games

Major awards

Critically acclaimed games
Metacritic is an aggregator of video game journalism reviews. It generally considers expansions and re-releases as separate entities.

Financial performance
The global market for video games based on 2020 revenues was estimated to exceed  according to the International Data Corporation; the growth of 20% over 2019 revenues is attributes to the surge in spending in video games from the COVID-19 pandemic along with the releases of the new consoles.

SuperData Research estimated the global video game market grew by 12% in 2020 to a total  in revenues.

As a result, Newzoo anticipated that the 2021 market will see a small decline as the world recovers from COVID-19 and spending on video games slows down, but otherwise the industry would remain on track to break  in revenue by 2023.

According to PricewaterhouseCoopers, while the overall global entertainment and media market dropped by 3.8% during 2020, the video game market grew by 10% over the year, due to the use of video games to help with social distancing during COVID-19 lockdowns.

Largest markets 
According to market research firm Newzoo, the following countries were the largest video game markets in 2020.

Highest-grossing games
The following are the top ten highest-grossing video games of 2020. The majority of the top ten titles are published by Asian companies, including three from Chinese conglomerate Tencent which holds the top two spots.

Highest-grossing free-to-play games
The following titles were the top ten highest-grossing free-to-play games in 2020. Three of the top ten free-to-play titles are published by Tencent, which holds the top two spots.

It fell out of the top ten, dropping from its top spot in 2019.

Best-selling premium games
The following titles were the best-selling premium games (including buy-to-play titles) in 2020. Three of the top ten best-selling titles are published by Nintendo, including the year's top-selling game.

Best-selling games by region
The following were 2020's top ten best-selling video games by region (excluding microtransactions and free-to-play titles) on PC and console platforms, for Australia, Japan, Europe, and the United States.

Major events

Impacts of the COVID-19 pandemic 

The highly contagious coronavirus disease 2019, first observed in China in December 2019, began a major outbreak across the world in January 2020, which is ongoing as of November 2021. Within China, steps to prevent spread of the disease came around such as large-scale quarantine of affected populations which have impacted production within the country. This has had a large number of impacts on social, medical, and economic systems worldwide. The video game industry has been impacted by the outbreak in various ways, most often due to concerns over travel to and from China or elsewhere, or related to slowdowns in manufacturing processes within China. Numerous games have been delayed due to the COVID-19 pandemic, and most industry events were cancelled or reformated into virtual showcases.

The video game industry in general was boosted by the pandemic, since people under pandemic lockdowns were forced to stay home, with video games becoming a popular pastime. Easy-to-learn games with little to no narrative and large audience enjoyment potential, including Fall Guys, Among Us, and the Jackbox Party Packs, saw great increases in popularity during the pandemic as a means to avoid the "cultural trauma" of the situation.

Reactions to the George Floyd protests
In the wake of the George Floyd protests and resurgence of support for the Black Lives Matter (BLM) movement across several entertainment sectors in June 2020, the video game industry also responded. Most large publishers and developers shared their support of the protests and BLM as with other larger entertainment companies. A number of video game announcement events had been planned on the week of June 6 and onward as a virtual replacement for E3 2020 (cancelled from the COVID-19 pandemic), but most of these were shifted by a week or more to allow the voices of the protests to have the necessary focus. Many companies announced plans to donate funds towards black-oriented organizations, including Electronic Arts, 2K Games, Riot Games and Humble Bundle committing  to such foundations, while others like Ubisoft, Square Enix and The Pokémon Company also committed to significant donations. Electronic Arts and Infinity Ward pledged to combat racism that they were aware had persisted by users in their games in light of the events.

Sexual misconduct accusations

In late June and early July, as a continuation of prior #MeToo movement effects on the industry from 2017, several people started speaking out of specific accounts of sexual misconduct and harassment towards others in the industry. Initial complaints had been directed towards Twitch streamers but soon had reached major companies including Insomniac Games, and Electronic Arts, with most studios taking actions to deal with the accused and instituting better policies to handle internal and external issued related to sexual misconduct. In particular, charges were made toward the CEO of Evolution Championship Series (EVO), Joey Cuellar, who was subsequently let go. Multiple publishers that had backed the event had pulled out on this news, and the EVO event, which had already been reworked as an online event due to the COVID-19 pandemic, was subsequently cancelled. A large number of cases were found through Ubisoft's executive-level staff, leading to a number of high-level departures and major internal review of how the company handled such complaints in the future.

Notable deaths

 April 8 – Rick May, 73, voice actor best known for the voice of Soldier in "Team Fortress 2".
 April 11 – Paul Haddad, 56, voice actor best known for the original voice of Leon Kennedy in the 1998 Resident Evil video game sequel "Resident Evil 2".
 July 2 – Reckful, 31, Twitch streamer and esports player.

Hardware releases
The list of game-related hardware released in 2020.

Major hardware discontinuations in 2020 include the Xbox One X and Xbox One S All-Digital versions, which were discontinued on July 16. The Nintendo 3DS family was discontinued on September 17.

Game releases

Series with new entries
Series with new installments include Animal Crossing, Assassin's Creed, Bloodstained, Bomberman, Call of Duty, Cook, Serve, Delicious!, Crash Bandicoot, Danganronpa, Deadly Premonition, Dirt, Doom, Dragon Ball, Dragon Quest, Final Fantasy, Granblue Fantasy, Half-Life, Kingdom Hearts, The Last of Us, The Legend of Zelda, Lego, Mafia, Mana, Medal of Honor, Megami Tensei, Microsoft Flight Simulator, Minecraft, MLB: The Show, Mystery Dungeon, Nioh, Oddworld, One Piece, Ori, Paper Mario, Persona, Project CARS, Resident Evil, Rune Factory, Serious Sam, Shantae, Spelunky, Spider-Man, Star Wars, Streets of Rage, Super Mario, Tom Clancy's Rainbow Six, Tony Hawk's Pro Skater, Total War, Trails, Vampire: The Masquerade, Wasteland, Watch Dogs, Windjammers, Yakuza, Command and Conquer, and Zombie Army.

January–March

April–June

July–September

October–December

Video game-based film and television releases

See also
2020 in games

Notes

References

 
Video games by year